The Monte Moro Pass (German: Monte-Moro-Pass, Italian: Passo del Monte Moro) is an Alpine pass located on the border between Switzerland and Italy. It connects Saas-Almagell in the Swiss canton of Valais to Macugnaga, Province of Verbano-Cusio-Ossola, in the Italian region of Piedmont. The pass lies at the foot of Monte Moro.

Historically the Monte Moro is an important border crossing between the valleys of Saas and Macugnaga. It is traversed by a trail and is one of the highest passes on the Monte Rosa Tour.

References

External links

Monte Moro Pass on Hikr

Mountain passes of Switzerland
Mountain passes of Italy
Mountain passes of the Alps